Benzil reductase ((R)-benzoin forming) is an enzyme with systematic name (R)-benzoin:NADP+ oxidoreductase. This enzyme catalyses the following chemical reaction

 (R)-benzoin + NADP+  benzil + NADPH + H+

The bacterial enzyme (Xanthomonas oryzae) enantioselectively reduces one of the two carbonyl groups of benzil to form optically active (R)-benzoin.

References

External links 
 

EC 1.1.1